Deomai is a village in Hilauli block of Unnao district, Uttar Pradesh, India. As of 2011, its population is 3,673, in 743 households, and it has 3 primary schools and 2 medical practitioners. It hosts a weekly haat and has a sub post office.

The 1961 census recorded Deomai as comprising 8 hamlets, with a total population of 1,717 (893 male and 824 female), in 319 households and 268 physical houses. The area of the village was given as 2,144 acres.

References

Villages in Unnao district